The Grigorovich MRL-1 was a long-range reconnaissance flying boat designed by the Grigorovich Design Bureau for the Soviet Navy in the mid-1920s.

Design
The MRL-1 had a very elegant and clean appearance, but the hull construction was very expensive due to the overuse of expensive redwood, and therefore seriously overweight. Gunner position was located right behind the propeller.

Although speed requirements were fulfilled, the ceiling and climb were unacceptably poor, and the flawed hull design precipitated 'wave pushing' and delayed takeoff. Therefore, the MRL-1 was not accepted for production, the lone airframe instead spending its career with the White Sea Fleet.

Specifications

References

Bibliography

Biplanes
Flying boats
1920s Soviet and Russian military reconnaissance aircraft
MRL-1
Aircraft first flown in 1925